Neohedobia is a genus of death-watch and spider beetles in the family Ptinidae. There is one described species in Neohedobia, N. texana.

References

Further reading

 
 
 
 

Bostrichoidea
Articles created by Qbugbot